Challenger Ltd is a provider of contract oil and gas land drilling and workover services.

History
Challenger is based in the Middle East and North Africa (MENA) region, and the company Chairman is Hassan Tatanaki.
The company was founded in 1991 and operated first in Africa later expanding into the Middle East.

Operations
Challenger is a provider of contract oil and gas land well drilling and work over services. The company owns and operates 25 drilling rigs in Libya providing drilling and work-over services for oil, gas, and water wells, with offices in Egypt, Saudi Arabia and the United Arab Emirates. Workover refers to any kind of oil well intervention involving invasive techniques, such as wireline, coiled tubing or snubbing. More specifically though, it will refer to the expensive process of pulling and replacing a Completion (oil well).

The company has an extensive client base, including several national oil companies as well as international corporations such as Agip/Eni, Total, Marathon Oil, Veba and Verenex Energy. Challenger works as a regular subcontractor to the state-owned National Oil Corporation of Libya. Challenger is one of the oldest drilling companies in Africa, and particularly in Libya. Since inception, the company has grown every year producing impressive financial results. Challenger is a private company limited by shares registered in the General Registry of the Isle of Man, G.B. It operates as a commercial entity through a network of branches in Liechtenstein, the Middle East and Africa. Financial Consultants and audit firms include KPMG and PriceWaterhouseCoopers.

Products and Services

Challenger - 14 OIME SL-7 
Challenger - 19 National 80-B Trailerized 
Challenger - 23 IRI- CABOT-900-Truck Mounted
Kenworth Trucks - (953-50 Ton, C500-35 Ton and Foremost Delta-3)
Trucks & Trailers - (Mercedes, Nissan Patrol, Toyota Land Cruiser, Toyota Pickup and MAN)
Oshkosh Trucks 
Loaders - (Caterpillar & Volvo)
Excavators - (Caterpillar -D7)

VC Bank Acquisition
In 2006, Venture Capital Bank (VC Bank), a Bahrain-based investment bank, along with its partner, the U.S. private equity firm Global Emerging Markets (GEM), acquired a significant stake in Challenger. The acquisition cost roughly $50 million and was co-financed by VC Bank and GEM. This transaction demonstrated that the MENA region contains several attractive, yet obscured, investment opportunities represented in privately held companies such as Challenger.

The investment is beneficial to both parties, allowing Challenger to achieve its growth plan and helping VC Bank to achieve its objectives of supporting companies in the MENA region. Challenger Chairman Hassan Tatanaki said that "amongst alternative financing routes available, Challenger's management decided to partner with VC Bank and GEM to fuel and expedite its capacity expansion plans and its geographical coverage." Tatanaki added that "in the oil sector, with Libya in particular, oil production in the 1970s was more than 3 million bpd compared to today's levels of 1.6 million bpd. Since the lifting of sanctions, exploration concessions have been granted to international exploration companies, which hope to drill 50 exploration wells per year."

VC Bank CEO Abdullatif Mohammed Janahi added, “our investment in Challenger will help the company snatch the exceptional growth potential in Libya and enter international markets. Soaring oil prices have brought about a supply/demand imbalance of oil rigs worldwide, leading oil and gas companies to spend more on exploration and production. This has, in turn, increased demand for oil drilling contractors such as Challenger.”

Challenger Limited: Selected Clients

Notes:
1. USGS 2002 (Bbbl = "billion barrels of oil").

See also 

 Energy in Egypt
 List of oilfield service companies

Notes

General references

Venture Capital Bank (2006) VC Bank Acquires Stake in Challenger 
Energy Information Administration (2007) Libya: Country Analysis
World Bank (2006), Libyan Economic Report, Social & Economic Development Group
P. Mobbs (2002) Mineral Industry of Libya
Thomas S. Ahlbrandt (2001) Sirte Basin Province: Sirte-Zelten Total Petroleum System U.S. Geological Survey
Tuareg Capital - News: Gulf Financiers in Libya Tuareg Capital
Challenger Company Profile Silicon Valley-San Jose Business Journal

External links
Challenger Limited Website

1991 establishments in Egypt
Business services companies established in 1991
Service companies of Egypt
Drilling rig operators
2006 mergers and acquisitions